Nelms is a surname. Notable people with the surname include:
O.L. Nelms, Dallas millionaire.
Builder and original owner of Longhorn Ballroom formerly known as Bob Wills Ranch House.

Charlie Nelms, American educator
Cory Nelms (born 1988), American football player
David Nelms (born 1961), American businessman
George H. Nelms (1905-1999), Canadian politician
Jason Nelms (born 1980), American basketball player
Mike Nelms (born 1955), American football player